IAMP may refer to:
Immaterial and Missing Power
International Association of Mathematical Physics
International Association for Military Pedagogy
International Advanced Manufacturing Park, a business part in Washington, UK